Rajiv Krishna is an Indian actor from Bangalore. He has appeared in Tamil films in leading and supporting roles.

He also wrote the screenplay for the Hindi films Woodstock Villa and Soundtrack. He is the nephew of producer Suresh Menon. In 2013, he wrote a novel called Thundergod — Ascendence of Indra.

Career 
Rajiv Krishna made his Tamil debut with Aahaa..! (1997). Regarding his performance, one  critic noted that "Rajiv's role is such that there is much scope for him to
display his acting skills and he has utilised the opportunity well". Following the success of Aahaa, Rajiv Krishna received several other offers to continue appearing in lead roles. He signed on to a film titled Kai Vilakku featuring him alongside Sangita, but the film failed to release despite entering production. He made his Bollywood debut Bas Yun Hi (2003) under the name Rajiv Gopalakrishnan. In the film, he starred opposite Nandita Das; however, the film failed to make a mark. He played negative roles in Newtonin Moondram Vidhi (2009) and Aasal (2010). He portrayed a mill owner in Krishnaveni Panjaalai (2012). 

Menon is also a screen-writer, having written forDus Kahaniyaan and Dhaakad. He also played the lead in Zen Katha, a play by Lilette Dubey. He was assistant director to Revathy on Mitr, My Friend(2002) and Phir Milenge(2004).

Filmography

Actor
Films

Television

Writer
Woodstock Villa (2008; Hindi)
Soundtrack (2011; Hindi)
Girls (2016; Malayalam) (screenplay consultant)

References

External links 

Male actors in Hindi cinema
Male actors in Tamil cinema
Living people
20th-century Indian male actors
21st-century Indian male actors
Male actors from Bangalore
Indian male film actors
Screenwriters from Bangalore
Indian male writers
Novelists from Karnataka
Indian male screenwriters
Male actors in Malayalam cinema
Malayalam screenwriters
Tamil actors
Year of birth missing (living people)